Flexcar is a vehicle subscription company based in Boston, MA. They offer weekly subscriptions to a variety of cars with touchless pickup from locations in Boston, Nashville, and Atlanta. Flexcars include maintenance and insurance and customers can cancel their subscription anytime without penalty.

The Flexcar brand was previously used for a car sharing company based in Seattle, Washington, the oldest and second-largest in the United States, behind Boston-based Zipcar, with which it merged in late 2007.  There is no connection between that company and the car subscription company based in Boston.

History of Flexcar Car Sharing Company (Discontinued)
Flexcar can date its origins to March 1998, when its strategic business planning was started by Flexcar cofounder and Champion Tracy Carroll, Dave Brook of Car Sharing Portland, Conrad Wagner of Mobility Switzerland and Neil Peterson, former Director of King County Metro.  Flexcar itself was founded in January 2000 in Seattle, Washington, as a public–private partnership with King County Metro.  Spurred on by the company's excellent customer service and Neighborhood Champions, Flexcar expanded to Los Angeles, San Diego, San Francisco, and San Jose, California; Gainesville, Florida; Rochester, New York; Atlanta, Georgia; Pittsburgh and Philadelphia, Pennsylvania; Tempe, Arizona (it served Phoenix in partnership with Arizona State University); Baltimore, Maryland; Washington, D.C. and Columbus, Ohio; and, to varying degrees, in their suburbs. In addition, Flexcar was partnered with the non-profit, I-GO carsharing service in Chicago, Illinois.

Flexcar members chose a rate plan and paid an annual fee.  The fees covered gasoline, insurance, maintenance, and cleaning.  The vehicles were mostly late-model sedans, with other types, such as light trucks, hybrids, convertibles, and minivans, also available. Each vehicle had a home location, a reserved space either in a parking lot or on a street, typically in a highly populated urban neighborhood (as well as, in some markets, on college or university campuses).  Members reserved a car by web or telephone and used a key card to access the vehicle.  The reservation was required to specify the pick up and return time, so others could schedule the vehicle.  Vehicles were returned to their home location.

The company targeted people who made only occasional use of a vehicle as well as people who wanted occasional access to a vehicle of a different type than they use day-to-day.   Flexcar claimed that the service was economically beneficial to anyone whose car would normally be away from their home about 15 hours a week, and did not need a car for their daily commute to work.

In several of its cities, the company had formed a public–private partnership with a local public transit entity. For example, in Seattle, they were partnered with King County Metro Transit, which operates the area's buses. The company's advertising materials there said, "Ride Metro when you don't need a car. Use Flexcar when you do."

Flexcar's strategic business planning, members relations plans, and branding was started in 1998 by the 4 cofounders of Flexcar - Tracy Carroll, CarSharing Champion, Dave Brook, founder of CarShare Portland, Conrad Wagner of Mobility Switzerland, and Neil Peterson of King County Metro.  in January 2000, the Flexcar service was launched to 100 members served by 4 cars in the Capitol Hill neighborhood of Seattle.  Through a public-private partnership with King County Metro, Flexcar became the second company in the United States to become completely carbon neutral in 2003.(the first company was Shaklee Corporation in 2001). By developing a partnership with American Forests, Flexcar ensured that enough trees were planted every year to offset the exhaust from its fleet of shared vehicles.

In August 2005, Revolution LLC, the holding company owned by Steve Case, founder of America Online, purchased a 60% holding interest in Flexcar. The company announced that this investment would lead to a rapid expansion of their operations.

In January 2007, Flexcar notified the member base of dramatic changes in the billing structure of their hourly rental.  Doing away with their flat fee for set hour and unlimited mileage rates, they announced the formation of a "Variable Pricing" plan, which calculated cost on peak and non-peak hours with mileage limited to 150 miles per day. Members were notified on the organization's website and by letter that, "[v]ariable pricing provides two benefits. Members with flexible schedules can now save money by reserving the car during its 'off-peak' time, in this case, on the weekend. Because some members will shift their trips to 'off-peak' times, the car’s availability should also improve during its 'peak' times as well."

On 30 October 2007, Flexcar executives announced a merger with car-sharing rival Zipcar. The merger consolidated the operations of the two corporations. Executives from both companies, in the announcement of the merger, stated that the Flexcar headquarters in Seattle would be closed, possibly resulting in the loss of jobs as operations transferred to Zipcar's headquarters in Boston.

Seattle 
Flexcar had 15,000 members in Seattle, about 2.5% of that city's population. It had proven popular among those who live in downtown Seattle or the nearby densely populated Capitol Hill and First Hill.

The company had also started an initiative to convince Downtown Seattle employers to join their program as business members rather than maintaining their own fleet vehicles.  Other market segments included placing vehicles at transit stations to provide "last mile" connectivity between transit and suburban office locations and providing subsidized vehicle access as part of low-income "jobs access" programs.

Portland 
In April 2001, Flexcar became the first car-sharing company in the U.S. to expand to a second city by acquiring CarSharing Portland in Portland.  At the time, Flexcar's customer base in Seattle included over 1300 members sharing 40 cars.  Carsharing Portland, which began business in March 1998, had at the time of its acquisition over 500 members with 25 vehicles in and around downtown Portland.

The last statistics provided by Flexcar's website showed that the service in Portland has grown to include over 130 vehicles, including  the Pearl District, Old Town Chinatown; close-in eastside neighborhoods such as the Lloyd District, Hawthorne, and Brooklyn; and downtown Vancouver, Washington.

See also
Transportation in Seattle
Transportation in Portland, Oregon
Transportation in Los Angeles

References

External links

Car Subscriptions

2000 establishments in Washington (state)
2007 disestablishments in Washington (state)
Car rental companies of the United States
Carsharing
Defunct companies based in Seattle
Defunct transportation companies of the United States
Public–private partnership projects in the United States
Transport companies established in 2000
Transport companies disestablished in 2007
Transportation companies based in Washington (state)